William Michael Sweet (born 12 April 1947) is a British bobsledder. He competed at the 1972 Winter Olympics and the 1976 Winter Olympics.

References

1947 births
Living people
British male bobsledders
Olympic bobsledders of Great Britain
Bobsledders at the 1972 Winter Olympics
Bobsledders at the 1976 Winter Olympics
Sportspeople from Pontypridd